Zig & Sharko (French: Zig et Sharko) is a French animated slapstick comedy television series created and directed by Olivier Jean-Marie and produced by Xilam Animation. The series' premise focuses on the lives of Zig, a brown hyena, and Sharko, a great white shark, over their conflicts regarding the mermaid Marina, in which Zig seeks to devour her while Sharko loves and protects her. The series employs silent comedy: characters either do not speak; rather they use unintelligible vocalizations, gestures, and occasional pictograms in speech balloons (the Indian version dubs Hindi dialogue over the animation instead).

Three seasons with a total of 78 half-hour episodes (234 seven-minute segments) were originally broadcast on December 21, 2010, followed by an official premiere on January 10, 2011 on Canal+ Family, with the second and third seasons airing on Gulli, and reruns airing on TF1. A third season was announced in December 2018. A fourth season was announced in 2022.

Premise 

The series focuses on the exploits and adventures of a group of characters - Zig, a brown hyena; Sharko, a great white shark; Marina, a mermaid with red hair; and Bernie, a hermit crab. Much of the stories of each episode revolve around an eternal war over Marina between Zig, who attempts to capture her to eat her, and Sharko, who loves her and acts as her bodyguard against Zig's various plans. The show itself draws inspiration for its plot and slapstick humor from the cartoons of Wile E. Coyote and the Road Runner, in that Zig often makes use of various items or concocts plans based on things he witnesses with Sharko and Marina, but is often foiled in the process by Sharko, bad luck, or a combination of both. Although the pair are enemies to each other because of their constant battles and grudges, they are also good friends, akin to the relationship of Tom and Jerry. Alongside the main characters, the show is frequently populated by minor background characters, many of whom are animals and aquatic creatures that, alongside Zig and Sharko, are portrayed as anthropomorphic beings.

Throughout the first season, much of the plots revolve around the oceans surrounding a tropical volcanic island, in which Marina often spends the day residing on a rocky pinnacle off the coast during the day, while residing in an underwater home that she shares with Sharko. In the third season, the main characters and the island's inhabitants move onto a cruise ship to travel the oceans, where much of the season's plots take place.

Characters
None of the characters in the series speak; a form of gibberish speech is sometimes used, but most interactions involve hand signals and body language to convey what a character is thinking about. The show's main characters include:

 Zig is an anthropomorphic brown hyena, and best friends with Bernie since childhood. He frequently plots to capture Marina to eat her, but his schemes for this purpose are often foiled by Sharko. He is often desperate and eager to eat Marina on sight, but is no better outside of his main motive. He has a comically dry and wheezy voice. The design of the character's behavior and characteristics were in part inspired by the cartoon character Wile E. Coyote.
 Sharko is an anthropomorphic great white shark, who appears brutish and tough, but is dorky with a heart of gold. He loves Marina and will do anything to protect her from harm, which include Zig's schemes. He is often portrayed as muscular and athletic, and is a fan of table tennis. In spite of his devotion to Marina, he can sometimes occasionally cause trouble for himself. During the first few episodes of the series, he was unable to get around on the island and can only swim in the ocean. Later on, he is capable of walking on dry land using his tail as feet. 
 Marina is a mermaid, who is good-natured, intelligent, bubbly and romantic - intrigued by anything new she encounters. She maintains a positive relationship with the other characters in the show, although this makes her quite naive to Zig's intentions to eat her. She is portrayed as wearing a small living sea star in her hair, and capable of walking on her tail (using her fins as feet). Her design was likely inspired by the character Ariel, from The Little Mermaid. 
 Bernie is a red anthropomorphic hermit crab, and Zig's best friend since childhood. He often collaborates in Zig's schemes to capture Marina, though holds no grudge against her or Sharko, in reality. He is often denoted as being quite smart, and capable of coming to the rescue when needed.

Aside from the main characters, various episodes feature a variety of background and minor characters to the stories - jungle animals, aquatic lifeforms, and various human characters - in the first season, one of these human characters is portrayed as a Japanese cargo ship captain, who, as a running gag, frequently crashes his ship into the island and is forced to return home with a rubber dingy. Throughout the first season, several episodes featured the supporting character of Neptune, based on the mythological Roman god of the sea and portrayed as a vain, muscular merman with numerous killer whale henchmen, who competed with Sharko for Marina's love, despite her disliking him. Marina despises him and often has to rely on Sharko and Zig to keep him at bay. The second season introduces Poseidon, portrayed as a muscular elderly merman, who served as Marina's adopted father in the episode "Father-In-Law", and an amnesiac human cargo plane pilot who often exhibits the behavior of a monkey due to his condition - one episode revolves around a flashback, where the pilot has met up with actual simians.

Episodes

Production and development 

In 2008, the television group Canal+ decided to develop pilot episodes for nine out of 135 animation projects received, including Zig and Sharko, for television broadcast during the 2010–2011 season. A development budget of 6 to 6.5 million euros ( to  million US dollars) was allocated to the series. The original title was The Mermaid, the Hyena and the Shark, and it is a co-production between the television channels TF1 and Canal+ Family which broadcast later this series. The type of animation is similar to the American series of Tex Avery, Bob Clampett and Tom and Jerry.

Dong Woo Animation and Armada TMT were the animation studios chosen for the series, similar to that of Space Goofs second season and Oggy and the Cockroaches third and fourth seasons. The development of the series was carried out by the French studios Xilam Animation. The series’ first season has been ordered and picked up by Xilam in 2009, which premiered on Canal+ on December 21, 2010, the series was launched on Canal+ Family on February 12, 2011, on Cartoon+ every Saturday at 7:40 pm. Xilam then produced a second season in 2013, changing its art style to match some of its modern TV shows, like Paprika and Lupin's Tales.

Distribution 
On May 6, 2015, the official YouTube channel of Zig & Sharko was created, with all of the episodes – in a high-quality, widescreen format – from seasons 1 to 3. The channel made also various compilations. The channel made episodes with English title cards. As of August 2021, the channel has 11.9 million subscribers making it one of the Top 10 most-subscribed French channels on the site. As of November 2020, "The Were-Yena" (the 67th episode of the first season) is the most-viewed episode of the official channel, with over 99 million views. The most-viewed compilation has 118 million views.

Spin-off 
In 2021, a spin-off series was created by Alexandre Simard, Mathieu Peters-Houg and Lucille Briand for Xilam, named The Adventures of Bernie. The series focused on the titular character who, while helping Zig in his next scheme to target and eat Marina, is sent off their island home in a freak accident and ends up in the depths of the rock-bottom ocean. The episodes focus on Bernie's endeavors in using his intelligence and inventive skills to find a way back home, and to Zig, all while meeting with a variety of new characters along the way. The series takes place in the same universe with a different art style like Oggy and the Cockroaches: Next Generation, and employs silent slapstick humor, but with each episode being three and a half minutes long – with the exception of the first episode.

Broadcast 
Zig & Sharko originated in France where it aired on Canal+ Family for the first season and on Gulli for seasons two and onwards. 

In the United States the series is available to stream on Netflix (seasons two and three only), Tubi, The Roku Channel, and the official Zig & Sharko YouTube channel. 

In India it aired on Nickelodeon then later Nickelodeon Sonic. 

It also airs in Italy on K2.

References

External links 
 
 Xilam catalog page 

2010s French animated television series
2020s French animated television series
2010 French television series debuts
2020 French television series endings
Animated television series about fish
Animated television series about mammals
Animated television series without speech
Canal+ original programming
French children's animated comedy television series
French flash animated television series
Mermaids in television
TV4 (Polish TV channel) original programming
Xilam